Telephone numbers in South Korea are organized and assigned using the following scheme

Overview 
 International call out: 00N (where N is the carrier code) followed by the distant country code and telephone number.
 Calling into Korea: +82 XX XXXX YYYY. The leading "0" is dropped when dialling into South Korea from abroad.
 Some 1566/1577/1588 telephone numbers cannot be dialed from abroad.
 Domestic long-distance call: 0NN (where NN is the carrier code) followed by the 0XX area code and XXXX YYYY number. See Domestic long-distance service code and Area code.
 Call to cellular : 01N XXXX YYYY (see Mobile phone number). When phone call is made between unified 010-number subscribers, leading 010 can be dropped (XXXX YYYY).
 Special service call : 0N0 XXXX YYYY (see Special service)

For example;
 Call 02-312-3456 within Seoul: 312-3456
 Call 02-312-3456 from elsewhere: 02-312-3456
 Call 051-212-3456 within Busan: 212-3456
 Call 051-212-3456 from elsewhere: 051-212-3456
 Call 02-312-3456 from abroad: +82-2-312-3456

South Korea uses an open dialing plan with a total length (including 0) of 9 to 11 digits and, within city, subscriber numbers 7 to 8 digits long. Dialing from mobile phones to any type of phone except 010 numbers, the area code must be included.

In 1998, telephone numbers in Seoul starting with 2 and 6 added more digit (02-2XX-YYYY to 02-22XX-YYYY, 02-6XX-YYYY to 02-26XX-YYYY). Before area codes were shortened from 4 digit to 2~3 digit in June 2000, there were 1 digit exchange number (usually "2") with some 2 digit exchange numbers so some phone numbers like 0347-61-XXXX, 0443-2-XXXX or 0525-40-XXXX existed. (now 031-761-XXXX, 043-652-XXXX and 055-340-XXXX)

Full list

International call carrier codes 
001 - KT international call
002 - LG U+ international call
003xx - International call over Internet Protocol or international special services
00365 - Sejong Telecom international call over Internet Protocol
005 - SK Broadband international call (Higher quality than the 5 digit prefix service from the same company)
006 - SK Telink international call (Higher quality than the 5 digit prefix service from the same company)
007xx - International call over Internet Protocol or international special services
00700 - SK Telink international call over Internet Protocol
00727 - KT international call over Internet Protocol
00766 - SK Broadband international call over Internet Protocol
00794 - Operator Service
008 - Sejong Telecom international call (Higher quality than the 5 digit prefix service from the same company)

Mobile prefixes 
010 - Mobile (All South Korea Mobile Phone Companies, from Jan 1, 2004)
011 - Mobile (SK Telecom, until Dec 31, 2003)(All South Korea Mobile Phone Companies, from Jan 1, 2004)
012 - Machine to machine (Former Beeper)
013xx - Mobile special net (wireless vessels etc.)
014xx - Point-to-Point Protocol Access number
015 - Mobile services: Paging services
016 - Mobile (KT, until Jun 30, 2003)(All South Korea Mobile Phone Companies, from Jul 1, 2004)
017 - Mobile (SK Telecom, until Dec 31, 2003)(All South Korea Mobile Phone Companies, from Jan 1, 2004)
018 - Mobile (KT, until Jun 30, 2003)(All South Korea Mobile Phone Companies, from Jul 1, 2004)
019 - Mobile (LG U+, until Dec 31, 2004)(All South Korea Mobile Phone Companies, from Jan 1, 2005)

Services 
030 - UMS
050 - Personal number service
050x - Anonymous virtual number service
060 - Telephone based intelligent service
070 - Internet phone (VoIP)
080 - Toll-free call

Area codes 
Before June 2000, South Korea used two- to four-digit area codes.
02 - Seoul and parts of Gyeonggi-do (Gwacheon, Gwangmyeong and some neighborhoods of Goyang and Hanam)
031 - Gyeonggi-do
032 - Incheon and parts of Gyeonggi-do (Bucheon and some insular communities of Ansan)
033 - Gangwon-do
041 - Chungcheongnam-do
042 - Daejeon and a part of Chungcheongnam-do (Gyeryong)
043 - Chungcheongbuk-do
044 - Sejong City
049 - Kaesong Industrial Region
051 - Busan
052 - Ulsan
053 - Daegu and a part of Gyeongsangbuk-do (Gyeongsan)
054 - Gyeongsangbuk-do
055 - Gyeongsangnam-do and a few neighborhoods of Ulsan
061 - Jeollanam-do
062 - Gwangju
063 - Jeollabuk-do
064 - Jeju-do

Domestic long-distance carrier codes 
It is not necessary to dial any carrier prefix before making a domestic long-distance call.
These prefixes are needed only when you want to choose a different carrier other than your default long-distance carrier (usually the same company that provides your phoneline).

081 - KT
082 - LG U+
083 - Sejong Telecom
084 - SK Broadband
085xx - [Domestic long-distance Value Added Service (VAS)]
086 - SK Telink
087 - (Currently not in use)
088 - (Currently not in use)

Special numbers 
100 - KT customer center
101 - LG U+ Home Service customer center
106 - SK Broadband customer center
107 - Video relay service
111 - NIS
112 - Police
113 - Spy reporting
Area Code + 114 - Directory assistance (Korea Info Service)
115 - KT Telegram
116 - KT standard time service
117 - School Violence Hotline (from 2012, previously: report sexual trafficking of women)
118 - Cyber terrorism report
119 - Fire brigade, ambulance
120 - Lifestyle service
121 - Water utility report
122 - Coast guard emergency
123 - KEPCO electric report
125 - Smuggling report
127 - Narcotics report
128 - Pollution report
129 - Coordination with social welfare service (after October 2005)
1300 - Postal services
1301 - Prosecutor service
Area Code + 131 - Weather forecasting
132 - Civil Action (Korea Legal Aid Corporation - for contract disputes)
1330 - KNTO tourist information (bus·train schedule, hotel·inn information, free translation service)
1331 - Human Rights Board
1332 - Finance Board
1333 - Transport information
1335 - Information communication service center
1336 - Infringement of personal information board
1337 - Military Safety Board
1338 - Communications service center and report
1339 - Emergency medical treatment
134 - Tourist information
1345 - Immigration Contact Center (multilingual support)
1350 - Labor Board
1355 - National Pension Service
1357 - Small and medium enterprise support
1365 - Volunteering information
1366 - Domestic abuse report
1369 - Financial Information Inquiry
1377 - Foodbank
1379 - Unreasonable infringement of livelihood report
1382 - Citizen Registry Confirmation
1385 - Business discomfort report and board
1388 - Minor mistreatment report
1389 - Elderly abuse hotline and board
1390 - Election information and infringement hotline
1391 - Baby abuse hotline
1398 - Child abuse hotline
1399 - Unclean grocery report
141 - Contact room (KT)
182 - Missing child report hotline
188 - National Board of Audit and Inspection

Collect call 
082-17,1677 - uplus  (Dacom) Collect call
1541 - KT Collect call
1677 - Sejong Telecom Collect call
1682 - SK Telink Collect call

Intelligent Network 
14XXXXXX
15XXXXXX
1544-XXXX - LG Dacom(LG U+) nationwide single number service
1566-XXXX - SK Broadband nationwide single number service
1577-XXXX - KT nationwide single number service
1588-XXXX - KT nationwide single number service
1599-XXXX - SK Telink nationwide single number service
16XXXXXX
1661-XXXX - LG U+ nationwide single number service
1688-XXXX - Sejong Telecom nationwide single number service

See also 
 Telephone numbers in China
 Telephone numbers in Vietnam
 Telephone numbers in the Philippines

References 

 ITU allocations list

Korea, South
Telecommunications in South Korea
South Korea communications-related lists